Herbert A. Littleton (July 1, 1930 – April 22, 1951) was a United States Marine who posthumously received the Medal of Honor for falling on an enemy grenade to save the lives of fellow Marines who were near him from the grenade blast. His heroic action and personal sacrifice took place during the Battle of Hwacheon in the Korean War.

Biography 
Littleton, known as "Hal", was born on July 1, 1930, in Mena, Arkansas. His parents, Paul and Maude Littleton then moved their family to Blackhawk, South Dakota. He attended elementary school in Spearfish, South Dakota and East Port  Orchard, Washington, and high school in Sturgis, South Dakota, where he played basketball and football. He was employed as an electrical appliance serviceman by an electrical appliance company in Rapid City, South Dakota.

While living in Blackhawk, Littleton enlisted in the Marine Corps Reserve on July 29, 1948, for a one-year term and took recruit training in San Diego, California. He graduated on October 2, and afterwards completed the Marine Corps field telephone course. He was assigned as a Telephoneman and Message Center Man with the Signal Battalion at Camp Pendleton. He was honorably discharged at Camp Pendleton with the rank of private first class on July 28, 1949. On July 29, he re-enlisted in the Marine Corps Reserve. In 1950, he moved to Nampa, Idaho, and worked as a lineman for Mountain States Telephone & Telegraph.

After the outbreak of the Korean War in June 1950, Littleton was called to active duty in September. He trained at Camp Pendleton and was sent to Korea with the 3rd Replacement Draft. On December 17, he was assigned as a radio operator with a four-man artillery forward observer team in Item ("I") Battery, 3rd Battalion, 11th Marines, 1st Marine Division and began participating in operations in south and central Korea. 

Littleton earned the nation's highest military award for valor on April 22, 1951, on Hill 44 in Chuncheon, South Korea, by deliberately falling upon and smothering an enemy grenade which exploded that was one of many thrown at his team's forward observation post while his observation team was serving with C Company, 1st Battalion, 7th Marines. By doing so, he saved the lives of the other three Marines including the officer and forward observer in charge of Littleton's team during the early morning enemy counterattack on C Company. He also prevented the radio from being damaged by taking it off before he was killed. The radio was used afterwards to direct artillery fire in order to repulse the Chinese attack during the battle to take the hill.

Memorial services were held for Littleton on October 17, 1951, in Nampa, Idaho and he was buried at Kohlerlawn Cemetery.

Littleton was the 16th Marine to receive the Medal of Honor in Korea. He was awarded the Medal of Honor by President Harry S. Truman in June 1952 and his parents were presented Littleton's Medal of Honor on August 19, 1952, during a ceremony at the Naval Reserve Training Center in Boise, Idaho which included the activation of the 44th Rifle Company, U.S. Marine Corps Reserve.

The Marine Corps League's Detachment 1261 in Mena, Arkansas was named after Littleton in December 2006. On September 7, 2000, a Littleton Medal of Honor monument was dedicated to him in Spearfish, South Dakota. In December 2009, the post office in Nampa was renamed in his honor.

Military awards 
Littleton's military awards include the following:
|

Medal of Honor citation 
PRIVATE FIRST CLASS HERBERT A. LITTLETON
UNITED STATES MARINE CORPS RESERVE
The President of the United States of America, in the name of Congress, takes pride in presenting the Medal of Honor (Posthumously) to Private First Class Herbert A Littleton (MCSN: 1084704), United States Marine Corps Reserve, 
For service set forth in the following 
citation:
for conspicuous gallantry and intrepidity at the risk of his life above and beyond the call of duty on 22 April 1951, while serving as a radio operator with an artillery forward observation team of Company C, First Battalion, Seventh Marines, FIRST Marine Division (Reinforced), in action against enemy aggressor forces near Chungchon, Korea. Standing watch when a well-concealed and numerically superior enemy force launched a violent night attack from nearby positions against his company, Private First Class Littleton quickly alerted the forward observation team and immediately moved into an advantageous position to assist in calling down artillery fire on the hostile force. When an enemy hand grenade was thrown into his vantage point shortly after the arrival of the remainder of the team, he unhesitatingly hurled himself on the deadly missile, absorbing its full, shattering impact in his body. By his prompt action and heroic spirit of self-sacrifice, he saved the other members of his team from serious injury or death and enabled them to carry on the vital mission which culminated in the repulse of the hostile attack. His indomitable valor in the face of almost certain death reflects the highest credit upon Private First Class Littleton and the United States Naval Service. He gallantly gave his life for his country.   :

/S/ HARRY S. TRUMAN

See also 

 List of Korean War Medal of Honor recipients

Notes

References 
 

 

1930 births
1951 deaths
American military personnel killed in the Korean War
United States Marine Corps Medal of Honor recipients
People from Mena, Arkansas
United States Marines
United States Marine Corps reservists
Korean War recipients of the Medal of Honor
People from Meade County, South Dakota
Deaths by hand grenade
Burials in Idaho
United States Marine Corps personnel of the Korean War